is a racing video game developed by Poly's and published by Sony Computer Entertainment of Japan (SCEJ). It was released for the PlayStation in Japan on December 16, 1994. The game and its sequel were directed by Kazunori Yamauchi, and are precursors to his subsequent racing series Gran Turismo.

Development and release
Motor Toon Grand Prix was developed in-house at SCEJ (making it Sony Computer Entertainment's first major in-house project for the PlayStation) and began production under the title "Poly Poly Circuit GP". The project was directed by Kazunori Yamauchi, who stated that it was the team's goal to create realistic driving simulation without distracting from the game's enjoyment. "Basically we're not trying to fake reality – I'd rather create the sensation of handling a remote control car but with the kind of dynamics that you'd expect from a real car," Yamauchi stated. "The cars' suspensions actually work – we've attempted to simulate the dynamic forces as they go around corners." Yamauchi's development group within SCEJ later formed Polyphony Digital, the company behind the realistic racing series Gran Turismo. The characters of Motor Toon Grand Prix were designed by Japanese artist Susumu Matsushita. The game was released exclusively in Japan on December 16, 1994. Its sequel was released in the US as a standalone installment.

Reception
On release, Famicom Tsūshin scored the game a 27 out of 40. Next Generation gave it two out of five stars. They highly praised the Time Attack mode, but said that the two-player modes are disappointing due to the split screen cutting away too much of the player's forward view and players not being allowed to choose the same car. They further criticized that "the odd foibles of MTGP and the unnatural way in which the cars handle means it falls well short of Ridge Racer in challenge and excitement."

References

1994 video games
Japan-exclusive video games
Kart racing video games
Multiplayer and single-player video games
PlayStation (console) games
PlayStation (console)-only games
Racing video games
Sony Interactive Entertainment games
Sony Interactive Entertainment franchises
Video games developed in Japan
Polyphony Digital games